John Rawleigh Jackson (1780 - after 1831) was a planter and slave-owner in Jamaica. He was elected to the House of Assembly of Jamaica in 1820 representing Port Royal where he was also the chief magistrate in 1831.

References 

Members of the House of Assembly of Jamaica
1780 births
Planters from the British West Indies
British slave owners
19th-century British businesspeople
19th-century Jamaican people
Magistrates of Jamaica
Port Royal
Year of death unknown